The Bulgarian Athletics Championships is an annual outdoor track and field competition organised by the Bulgarian Athletic Federation, which serves as the national championship for the sport in Bulgaria.

Men

100 metres
1960: Petar Manev
1961: Mikhail Bachvarov
1962: Mikhail Bachvarov
1963: Mikhail Bachvarov
1964: Konstantin Shipokliev
1965: Zhivko Traykov
1966: Konstantin Shipokliev
1967: Zhivko Traykov
1968: Zhivko Traykov
1969: Georgi Georgiev
1970: Georgi Yovchev
1971: Georgi Yovchev
1972: Georgi Georgiev
1973: Georgi Georgiev
1974: Petar Petrov
1975: Vladimir Ivanov
1976: Petar Petrov
1977: Petar Petrov
1978: Petar Petrov
1979: Petar Petrov
1980: Petar Petrov
1981: Ivaylo Karanyotov
1982: Valentin Atanasov
1983: Valentin Atanasov
1984: Bogomil Karadimov
1985: Valentin Atanasov
1986: Valentin Atanasov
1987: Valentin Atanasov
1988: Valentin Atanasov
1989: Nikolay Antonov
1990: Nikolay Antonov
1991: Valentin Atanasov
1992: Dimitar Pintev
1993: Radoslav Paskalev
1994: Stoyan Manolov
1995: Plamen Slavchev
1996: Radoslav Paskalev
1997: Khristo Khristov
1998: Radoslav Paskalev
1999: Petko Yankov
2000: 
2001: Petko Yankov
2002: Petko Yankov
2003: 
2004: Milen Tsvetanov
2005: Desislav Gunev
2006: Yordan Ilinov

200 metres
1960: Dimitar Dimitrov
1961: Mikhail Bachvarov
1962: Mikhail Bachvarov
1963: Yordan Glukhchev
1964: Yordan Glukhchev
1965: Yordan Glukhchev
1966: Miroslav Lalov
1967: Todor Dyulgerov
1968: Trendafil Terziyski
1969: Trendafil Terziyski
1970: Dimcho Arnaoudov
1971: Todor Dyulgerov
1972: Georgi Georgiev
1973: Georgi Georgiev
1974: Petar Petrov
1975: Pavel Pavlov
1976: Petar Petrov
1977: Petar Petrov
1978: Pavel Pavlov
1979: Vladimir Ivanov
1980: Vladimir Ivanov
1981: Ivaylo Karanyotov
1982: Krasimir Sarbakov
1983: Bogomil Karadimov
1984: Bogomil Karadimov
1985: Yordan Vandov
1986: Nikolay Markov
1987: Nikolay Antonov
1988: Bogomil Karadimov
1989: Nikolay Antonov
1990: Nikolay Antonov
1991: Nikolay Antonov
1992: Anton Ivanov
1993: Tsvetoslav Stankoulov
1994: Stoyan Manolov
1995: Milen Nikolov
1996: Anton Ivanov
1997: Anton Ivanov
1998: Petko Yankov
1999: Aleksandar Petrov
2000: Milen Petrov
2001: Petko Yankov
2002: Petko Yankov
2003: Iliya Dzhivondov
2004: Yordan Ilinov
2005: Yordan Ilinov
2006: Yordan Ilinov

400 metres
1960: Dimitar Dimitrov
1961: Dimitar Dimitrov
1962: Anton Antonov
1963: Zlatko Valchev
1964: Zlatko Valchev
1965: Zlatko Valchev
1966: Khristo Gergov
1967: Yordan Todorov
1968: Georgi Bozhkov
1969: Georgi Bozhkov
1970: Krastyo Khristov
1971: Krastyo Khristov
1972: Krastyo Khristov
1973: Nartsis Popov
1974: Marin Danov
1975: Vasil Kasov
1976: Nartsis Popov
1977: Nartsis Popov
1978: Nartsis Popov
1979: Nartsis Popov
1980: Nartsis Popov
1981: Toma Tomov
1982: Toma Tomov
1983: Toma Tomov
1984: Krasimir Demirev
1985: Dimitar Rangelov
1986: Momchil Kharizanov
1987: Dimitar Rangelov
1988: Dimitar Rangelov
1989: Toma Tomov
1990: Kiril Raykov
1991: Tsvetoslav Stankoulov
1992: Anton Ivanov
1993: Anton Ivanov
1994: Anton Ivanov
1995: Anton Ivanov
1996: Tsvetomir Marinov
1997: Anton Petrov
1998: Sevdalin Maksimov
1999: Iliya Dzhivondov
2000: Iliya Dzhivondov
2001: Iliya Dzhivondov
2002: Iliya Dzhivondov
2003: Plamen Ignatov
2004: Vladimir Kharalampiev
2005: Krasimir Braykov
2006: Krasimir Braykov

800 metres
1960: Georgi Sapundzhiev
1961: Tsvyatko Spasov
1962: Tsvyatko Spasov
1963: Tsvyatko Spasov
1964: Yoncho Kalchev
1965: Angel Markov
1966: Yoncho Kalchev
1967: Zlatko Valchev
1968: Zlatko Valchev
1969: Zlatko Valchev
1970: Petar Kyatovski
1971: Atanas Atanasov
1972: Atanas Atanasov
1973: Petar Kyatovski
1974: Petar Kyatovski
1975: Venelin Stefanov
1976: Vladimir Kanev
1977: Moncho Marinov
1978: Binko Kolev
1979: Binko Kolev
1980: Anatoli Iliev
1981: Nikolay Cholakov
1982: Binko Kolev
1983: Binko Kolev
1984: Binko Kolev
1985: Boyko Trayanov
1986: Binko Kolev
1987: Sergei Mitov
1988: Miroslav Chochkov
1989: Miroslav Chochkov
1990: Miroslav Chochkov
1991: Dian Petkov
1992: Sergei Mitov
1993: Dian Petkov
1994: Dian Petkov
1995: Dian Petkov
1996: Dian Petkov
1997: Khristo Moisev
1998: Nikolay Nikov
1999: Khristo Moisev
2000: Khristo Moisev
2001: 
2002: 
2003: 
2004: 
2005: Boyan Kodinov
2006: Stefan Stefanov

1500 metres
1960: Dimitar Angelov
1961: Dimitar Angelov
1962: Dimitar Angelov
1963: Dimitar Angelov
1964: Dimitar Angelov
1965: Dimitar Angelov
1966: Yoncho Kalchev
1967: Yoncho Kalchev
1968: Atanas Atanasov
1969: Atanas Atanasov
1970: Petko Yordanov
1971: Atanas Atanasov
1972: Atanas Atanasov
1973: Petar Kyatovski
1974: Veselin Tsanov
1975: Atanas Atanasov
1976: Vladimir Kanev
1977: Vladimir Kanev
1978: Vladimir Kanev
1979: Vladimir Kanev
1980: Vladimir Kanev
1981: Georgi Georgiev
1982: Evgeni Ignatov
1983: Ivan Angelkov
1984: Mustafa Mustafov
1985: Mladen Danailov
1986: Evgeni Ignatov
1987: Evgeni Ignatov
1988: Miroslav Chochkov
1989: Miroslav Chochkov
1990: Sergei Mitov
1991: Zhelyazko Zhelev
1992: Dian Petkov
1993: Khristo Stefanov
1994: Svetlin Prodanov
1995: Burgaz Yordanov
1996: Stanislav Lambev
1997: Stanislav Lambev
1998: Stanislav Lambev
1999: Stanislav Lambev
2000: Stanislav Lambev
2001: 
2002: Stanislav Lambev
2003: Stanislav Lambev
2004: Stanislav Lambev
2005: Stefan Stefanov
2006: Emil Bozhanov

5000 metres
1960: Ivan Peev
1961: Ventsislav Borisov
1962: Not held
1963: Lyuben Danailov
1964: Dimitar Angelov
1965: Slavei Florov
1966: Milen Tsonev
1967: Mikhail Markov
1968: Atanas Atanasov
1969: Mikhail Zhelev
1970: Mikhail Zhelev
1971: Georgi Tikhov
1972: Georgi Tikhov
1973: Petko Yordanov
1974: Petko Karpachev
1975: Atanas Atanasov
1976: Petko Yordanov
1977: Yordan Chilikov
1978: Detelin Maslov
1979: Vladimir Kanev
1980: Evgeni Ignatov
1981: Stanimir Nenov
1982: Evgeni Ignatov
1983: Panayot Kashanov
1984: Zdravko Todorov
1985: Evgeni Ignatov
1986: Evgeni Ignatov
1987: Evgeni Ignatov
1988: Evgeni Ignatov
1989: Evgeni Ignatov
1990: Evgeni Ignatov
1991: Evgeni Ignatov
1992: Borislav Danchev
1993: Khristo Stefanov
1994: Khristo Stefanov
1995: Yordan Dimitrov
1996: Ivan Chotov
1997: Khristo Stefanov
1998: Petko Stefanov
1999: Aleksandar Andonov
2000: Petko Stefanov
2001: Petko Stefanov
2002: Stanislav Lambev
2003: Khristo Khristov
2004: Nikolay Iliev
2005: Yolo Nikolov
2006: Ivaylo Ignatov

10,000 metres
1960: Rayko Zdravkov
1961: Dimitar Vuchkov
1962: Ventsislav Borisov
1963: Dimitar Vuchkov
1964: Dimitar Vuchkov
1965: Dimitar Vuchkov
1966: Ivan Peev
1967: Milen Tsonev
1968: Mikhail Zhelev
1969: Georgi Tikhov
1970: Khristo Georgiev
1971: Petko Yordanov
1972: Georgi Tikhov
1973: Dinyo Dinev
1974: Atanas Barzanov
1975: Atanas Galabov
1976: Dinyo Dinev
1977: Yordan Chilikov
1978: Yordan Chilikov
1979: Petko Karpachev
1980: Petko Karpachev
1981: Rumen Mekhandzhiyski
1982: Petko Karpachev
1983: Rumen Mekhandzhiyski
1984: Rumen Mekhandzhiyski
1985: Rumen Mekhandzhiyski
1986: Emil Stoyanov
1987: Evgeni Ignatov
1988: Evgeni Ignatov
1989: Evgeni Ignatov
1990: Khristo Stefanov
1991: Evgeni Ignatov
1992: Evgeni Ignatov
1993: Ivan Chotov
1994: Khristo Stefanov
1995: Dimitar Dimitrov
1996: Petko Stefanov
1997: Khristo Stefanov
1998: Petko Stefanov
1999: Nikolay Marinov
2000: Petko Stefanov
2001: Petko Stefanov
2002: Nikolay Iliev
2003: Petko Stefanov
2004: Stanislav Lambev
2005: Stanislav Lambev
2006: Stanislav Lambev

Half marathon
1995: Dimitar Dimitrov
1996: Ivan Chotov
1997: Daniel Dukov
1998: Petko Stefanov
1999: Aleksandar Andonov
2000: Khristo Stefanov
2001: Petko Stefanov
2002: Petko Stefanov
2003: Petko Stefanov
2004: Ivan Chotov
2005: Stanislav Lambev
2006: Nikolay Iliev

Marathon
1960: Georgi Penchev
1961: Georgi Penchev
1962: Nikolay Solovyov
1963: Nikolay Solovyov
1964: Nikolay Solovyov
1965: Ivaylo Sharankov
1966: Ivaylo Sharankov
1967: Ivaylo Sharankov
1968: Yumer Bayramov
1969: Ivaylo Sharankov
1970: Khikmet Rasimov
1971: Khikmet Rasimov
1972: Ivaylo Sharankov
1973: Khristo Petrov
1974: Atanas Galabov
1975: Atanas Galabov
1976: Dinyo Dinev
1977: Atanas Galabov
1978: Vasil Lechev
1979: Yordan Chilikov
1980: Yordan Chilikov
1981: Yordan Chilikov
1982: Stanimir Nenov
1983: Stanimir Nenov
1984: Vasil Lechev
1985: Angel Zanev
1986: Stanimir Penchev
1987: Veselin Vasilev
1988: Stanimir Nenov
1989: Khristo Georgiev
1990: Vladimir Panovski
1991: Ivan Stoyanov
1992: Rangel Filipov
1993: Georgi Georgiev
1994: Petko Stefanov
1995: Georgi Georgiev
1996: Petko Stefanov
1997: Khristo Stefanov
1998: Boyko Zlatanov
1999: Petko Stefanov
2000: Petko Stefanov
2001: Petko Stefanov
2002: Petko Stefanov
2003: Petko Stefanov
2004: Petko Stefanov
2005: Aleksandar Panovski

3000 metres steeplechase
1960: Ivan Peev
1961: Ivan Peev
1962: Nikolay Solovyov
1963: Ivan Peev
1964: Ivan Peev
1965: Ivan Peev
1966: Mikhail Zhelev
1967: Bozhidar Stefanov
1968: Mikhail Zhelev
1969: Mikhail Zhelev
1970: Mikhail Zhelev
1971: Georgi Tikhov
1972: Petko Yordanov
1973: Stoyan Shatov
1974: Mikhail Zhelev
1975: Petko Yordanov
1976: Petko Yordanov
1977: Petko Yordanov
1978: Zhivko Zapryanov
1979: Aleksandar Ognyanov
1980: Stanimir Nenov
1981: Panayot Kashanov
1982: Panayot Kashanov
1983: Panayot Kashanov
1984: Panayot Kashanov
1985: Panayot Kashanov
1986: Anton Tomov
1987: Panayot Kashanov
1988: Panayot Kashanov
1989: Panayot Kashanov
1990: Svetlin Strashilov
1991: Borislav Danchev
1992: Burgaz Yordanov
1993: Burgaz Yordanov
1994: Ventsislav Chavdarov
1995: Burgaz Yordanov
1996: Stefan Stanchev
1997: Burgaz Yordanov
1998: Katerin Stoilov
1999: Stefan Stefanov
2000: Georgi Georgiev
2001: Stefan Stefanov
2002: Georgi Georgiev
2003: Georgi Georgiev
2004: Georgi Georgiev
2005: Georgi Georgiev
2006: Stanislav Lambev

110 metres hurdles
1960: Georgi Kaburov
1961: Petar Bozhinov
1962: Petar Bozhinov
1963: Petar Bozhinov
1964: Petar Bozhinov
1965: Petar Bozhinov
1966: Petar Bozhinov
1967: Krasimir Petkov
1968: Ilia Iliev
1969: Slavcho Dimitrov
1970: Slavcho Dimitrov
1971: Slavcho Dimitrov
1972: Slavcho Dimitrov
1973: Slavcho Dimitrov
1974: Georgi Mlyakov
1975: Georgi Mlyakov
1976: Georgi Mlyakov
1977: Vasko Nedyalkov
1978: Plamen Krastev
1979: Vasko Nedyalkov
1980: Plamen Krastev
1981: Plamen Krastev
1982: Plamen Krastev
1983: Ventsislav Radev
1984: Plamen Krastev
1985: Plamen Krastev
1986: Plamen Krastev
1987: Plamen Krastev
1988: Plamen Krastev
1989: Zhelyazko Zhelyazkov
1990: Georgi Georgiev
1991: Georgi Georgiev
1992: Georgi Georgiev
1993: Georgi Georgiev
1994: Georgi Georgiev
1995: Vasil Frangov
1996: Zhivko Videnov
1997: Zhivko Videnov
1998: Zhivko Videnov
1999: Zhivko Videnov
2000: Nikolay Koykov
2001: Nikolay Koykov
2002: Zhivko Videnov
2003: Kosta Angelov
2004: Kosta Angelov
2005: 
2006: Yavor Lochov & Zlatan Petrov

200 metres hurdles
1969: Slavcho Dimitrov
1970: Slavcho Dimitrov
1971: Rayko Krastev
1972: Slavcho Dimitrov
1973: Slavcho Dimitrov
1974: Slavcho Dimitrov

400 metres hurdles
1960: Aleksandar Chenger
1961: Dimitar Dimitrov
1962: Dimitar Dimitrov
1963: Vladimir Tabakov
1964: Vladimir Tabakov
1965: Vladimir Tabakov
1966: Khristo Gergov
1967: Khristo Gergov
1968: Khristo Gergov
1969: Khristo Gergov
1970: Khristo Gergov
1971: Khristo Gergov
1972: Yanko Bratanov
1973: Yanko Bratanov
1974: Yanko Bratanov
1975: Yordan Yordanov
1976: Slavcho Dimitrov
1977: Slavcho Dimitrov
1978: Yanko Bratanov
1979: Yanko Bratanov
1980: Slavcho Dimitrov
1981: Krasimir Demirev
1982: Krasimir Demirev
1983: Krasimir Demirev
1984: Toma Tomov
1985: Toma Tomov
1986: Toma Tomov
1987: Toma Tomov
1988: Toma Tomov
1989: Krasimir Demirev
1990: Toma Tomov
1991: Krasimir Demirev
1992: Assen Markov
1993: Plamen Nyagin
1994: Plamen Nyagin
1995: Plamen Nyagin
1996: Plamen Nyagin
1997: Plamen Nyagin
1998: Plamen Nyagin
1999: Boril Varidanov
2000: Plamen Nyagin
2001: Iliya Dzhivondov
2002: Iliya Dzhivondov
2003: Stanislav Petkov
2004: Stanislav Petkov
2005: 
2006: Stanislav Petkov

High jump
1960: Georgi Koumanov
1961: Georgi Koumanov
1962: Georgi Koumanov
1963: Evgeni Yordanov
1964: Evgeni Yordanov
1965: Evgeni Yordanov
1966: Evgeni Yordanov
1967: Georgi Koumanov
1968: Evgeni Yordanov
1969: Petar Bogdanov
1970: Petar Bogdanov
1971: Petar Bogdanov
1972: Petar Bogdanov
1973: Petar Bogdanov
1974: Peycho Zhekov
1975: Peycho Zhekov
1976: Ivan Iliev
1977: Ivan Boychev
1978: Rumen Yotsov
1979: Rumen Yotsov
1980: Atanas Mladenov
1981: Georgi Gadzhev
1982: Atanas Mladenov
1983: Rumen Yotsov
1984: Georgi Gadzhev
1985: Valentin Gatov
1986: Georgi Dakov
1987: Georgi Dakov
1988: Georgi Dakov
1989: Kotzo Kostov
1990: Georgi Dakov
1991: Georgi Dakov
1992: Robert Marinov
1993: Robert Marinov
1994: Dimitar Toychev
1995: Ivan Ivanov
1996: Georgi Getov
1997: Metin Dormushev
1998: Metin Dormushev
1999: Ivan Varbanov
2000: Angel Kararadev
2001: Angel Kararadev
2002: Georgi Getov
2003: Georgi Getov
2004: Georgi Getov
2005: Stoyan Kekov
2006: Stefan Altanov

Pole vault
1960: Khristo Khristov
1961: Dimitar Khlebarov
1962: Dimitar Khlebarov
1963: Dimitar Khlebarov
1964: Dimitar Khlebarov
1965: Dimitar Khlebarov
1966: Dimitar Khlebarov
1967: Velko Velkov
1968: Dimitar Khlebarov
1969: Nikolay Kenanov
1970: Dimitar Khlebarov
1971: Dimitar Khlebarov
1972: Ivan Minkov
1973: Veselin Tsonev
1974: Ivan Minkov
1975: Veselin Tsonev
1976: Atanas Tarev
1977: Atanas Tarev
1978: Atanas Tarev
1979: Atanas Tarev
1980: Atanas Tarev
1981: Atanas Tarev
1982: Atanas Tarev
1983: Atanas Tarev
1984: Atanas Tarev
1985: Atanas Tarev
1986: Atanas Tarev
1987: Nikolay Nikolov
1988: Atanas Tarev
1989: Delko Lesev
1990: Galin Nikov
1991: Nikolay Nikolov
1992: Galin Nikov
1993: Delko Lesev
1994: Iliyan Efremov
1995: Iliyan Efremov
1996: Khristo Kuzov
1997: Khristo Kuzov
1998: Iliyan Efremov
1999: Marin Karailiev
2000: Iliyan Efremov
2001: Spas Bukhalov
2002: Iliyan Efremov
2003: Iliyan Efremov
2004: Iliyan Efremov
2005: Iliyan Efremov
2006: Iliyan Efremov

Long jump
1960: Stoyan Slavkov
1961: Raycho Tsonev
1962: Raycho Tsonev
1963: Raycho Tsonev
1964: Raycho Tsonev
1965: Raycho Tsonev
1966: Raycho Tsonev
1967: Tseno Manchev
1968: Raycho Tsonev
1969: Todor Tsoutsekov
1970: Georgi Marin
1971: Georgi Marin
1972: Plamen Penchev
1973: Boncho Bonev
1974: Yordan Yanev
1975: Georgi Chavdarov
1976: Emilio Benekov
1977: Plamen Penchev
1978: Ivan Tuparov
1979: Georgi Doynov
1980: Ivan Tuparov
1981: Atanas Chochev
1982: Ivan Tuparov
1983: Atanas Chochev
1984: Ivan Tuparov
1985: Atanas Chochev
1986: Atanas Chochev
1987: Vladimir Amidzhinov
1988: Vladimir Amidzhinov
1989: Daniel Ivanov
1990: Atanas Atanasov
1991: Ivan Stoyanov
1992: Galin Georgiev
1993: Ivaylo Mladenov
1994: Ivaylo Mladenov
1995: Galin Georgiev
1996: Nikolay Antonov
1997: Stanislav Georgiev
1998: Nikolay Atanasov
1999: Nikolay Atanasov
2000: Petar Dachev
2001: Nikolay Atanasov
2002: Petar Dachev
2003: Petar Dachev
2004: Nikolay Atanasov
2005: Atanas Rusenov
2006: Nikolay Atanasov

Triple jump
1960: Dodyu Patarinski
1961: Lyuben Gourgoushinov
1962: Dodyu Patarinski
1963: Lyuben Gourgoushinov
1964: Georgi Stoykovski
1965: Georgi Stoykovski
1966: Georgi Stoykovski
1967: Dodyu Patarinski
1968: Georgi Stoykovski
1969: Georgi Stoykovski
1970: Georgi Stoykovski
1971: Georgi Stoykovski
1972: Nikolay Mikovski
1973: Kiril Aladzhov
1974: Kiril Aladzhov
1975: Mikhail Mikhalev
1976: Mikhail Mikhalev
1977: Georgi Georgiev
1978: Georgi Georgiev
1979: Atanas Chochev
1980: Atanas Chochev
1981: Veselin Stoykov
1982: Krasimir Dzhaldeti
1983: Georgi Pomashki
1984: Khristo Markov
1985: Khristo Markov
1986: Khristo Markov
1987: Khristo Markov
1988: Khristo Markov
1989: Nikolay Avramov
1990: Emil Ivanov
1991: Angel Shikov
1992: Angel Shikov
1993: Kotzo Kostov
1994: Kotzo Kostov
1995: Galin Georgiev
1996: Kotzo Kostov
1997: Nikolay Raev
1998: Nikolay Raev
1999: Ivaylo Rusenov
2000: Ivaylo Rusenov
2001: Vasil Gergov
2002: Yuri Litvinski
2003: Ivaylo Rusenov
2004: Momchil Karailiev
2005: Momchil Karailiev
2006: Zhivko Petkov

Shot put
1960: Boris Kaleev
1961: Boris Kaleev
1962: Boris Kaleev
1963: Boris Kaleev
1964: Boris Kaleev
1965: Valcho Ivanov
1966: Spas Dzhurov
1967: Todor Artarski
1968: Tencho Gospodinov
1969: Tencho Gospodinov
1970: Tencho Gospodinov
1971: Mikhail Kyoshev
1972: Valcho Stoev
1973: Valcho Stoev
1974: Valcho Stoev
1975: Mikhail Kyoshev
1976: Nikola Khristov
1977: Nikola Khristov
1978: Nikola Khristov
1979: Valcho Stoev
1980: Valcho Stoev
1981: Nikola Khristov
1982: Nikola Khristov
1983: Nikolay Gemizhev
1984: Nikolay Gemizhev
1985: Ventsislav Khristov
1986: Georgi Todorov
1987: Georgi Todorov
1988: Georgi Todorov
1989: Ventsislav Khristov
1990: Georgi Todorov
1991: Ventsislav Khristov
1992: Radoslav Despotov
1993: Radoslav Despotov
1994: Radoslav Despotov
1995: Kiril Valchanov
1996: Radoslav Despotov
1997: Miroslav Kostov
1998: Ventsislav Velichkov
1999: Miroslav Kostov
2000: Galin Kostadinov
2001: Krasimir Aleksandrov
2002: Krasimir Aleksandrov
2003: Galin Kostadinov
2004: Galin Kostadinov
2005: Galin Kostadinov
2006: Galin Kostadinov

Discus throw
1960: Todor Artarski
1961: Dimitar Milev
1962: Todor Artarski
1963: Todor Artarski
1964: Georgi Damyanov
1965: Todor Artarski
1966: Georgi Gyurov
1967: Todor Artarski
1968: Todor Artarski
1969: Todor Artarski
1970: Todor Artarski
1971: Todor Artarski
1972: Velko Velev
1973: Velko Velev
1974: Velko Velev
1975: Emil Vladimirov
1976: Velko Velev
1977: Velko Velev
1978: Velko Velev
1979: Velko Velev
1980: Emil Vladimirov
1981: Emil Vladimirov
1982: Velislav Prokhaska
1983: Velko Velev
1984: Velko Velev
1985: Georgi Georgiev
1986: Kamen Dimitrov
1987: Kamen Dimitrov
1988: Georgi Georgiev
1989: Georgi Georgiev
1990: Nikolay Kolev
1991: Georgi Georgiev
1992: Nikolay Kolev
1993: Kamen Dimitrov
1994: Iliyan Iliev
1995: Iliyan Iliev
1996: Iliyan Iliev
1997: Kiril Angelov
1998: Iliyan Manolov
1999: Miroslav Kostov
2000: Encho Shterev
2001: Ivan Stanev
2002: Encho Shterev
2003: Encho Shterev
2004: Encho Shterev
2005: Encho Shterev
2006: Encho Shterev

Hammer throw
1960: Vasil Kroumov
1961: Vasil Kroumov
1962: Vasil Kroumov
1963: Vasil Kroumov
1964: Vasil Kroumov
1965: Vasil Kroumov
1966: Valcho Ivanov
1967: Valcho Ivanov
1968: Dimitar Mindov
1969: Dimitar Mindov
1970: Dimitar Mindov
1971: Dimitar Mindov
1972: Dimitar Mindov
1973: Todor Manolov
1974: Dimitar Mindov
1975: Dimitar Mindov
1976: Todor Manolov
1977: Emanuil Dyulgerov
1978: Emanuil Dyulgerov
1979: Dragomir Angelov
1980: Emanuil Dyulgerov
1981: Emanuil Dyulgerov
1982: Emanuil Dyulgerov
1983: Emanuil Dyulgerov
1984: Ivan Tanev
1985: Plamen Minev
1986: Emanuil Dyulgerov
1987: Viktor Apostolov
1988: Ivan Tanev
1989: Plamen Minev
1990: Plamen Minev
1991: Ivan Tanev
1992: Ivan Tanev
1993: Petar Tsvetanov
1994: Plamen Minev
1995: Plamen Minev
1996: Plamen Minev
1997: Plamen Minev
1998: Mladen Dimitrov
1999: Andrian Andreev
2000: Andrian Andreev
2001: Rosen Zhelev
2002: Andrian Andreev
2003: Rosen Zhelev
2004: Rosen Zhelev
2005: Andrian Andreev
2006: Andrian Andreev

Javelin throw
1960: Mityu Dichev
1961: Stoyo Pavlov
1962: Mityu Dichev
1963: Mityu Dichev
1964: Stoyo Pavlov
1965: Mityu Dichev
1966: Petar Rousev
1967: Mityu Dichev
1968: Milcho Milenski
1969: Ivan Pavlov
1970: Milcho Milenski
1971: Milcho Milenski
1972: Milcho Milenski
1973: Dinyo Dinev
1974: Valentin Dzhonev
1975: Kosta Denishev
1976: Valentin Dzhonev
1977: Stefan Stoykov
1978: Valentin Dzhonev
1979: Stefan Stoykov
1980: Valentin Dzhonev
1981: Ivan Angelov
1982: Stefan Stoykov
1983: Stefan Stoykov
1984: Raycho Dimitrov
1985: Raycho Dimitrov
1986: Emil Tsvetanov
1987: Emil Tsvetanov
1988: Emil Tsvetanov
1989: Emil Tsvetanov
1990: Emil Tsvetanov
1991: Angel Mandzhukov
1992: Georgi Stambolski
1993: Emil Tsvetanov
1994: Angel Mandzhukov
1995: Angel Mandzhukov
1996: Angel Mandzhukov
1997: Emil Tsvetanov
1998: Mikhail Kostov
1999: Mikhail Kostov
2000: Angel Mandzhukov
2001: Kolyo Neshev
2002: Kolyo Neshev
2003: Mikhail Kostov
2004: Mikhail Kostov
2005: Kolyo Neshev
2006: Kolyo Neshev

Decathlon
1960: Stoyan Slavkov
1961: Stoyan Slavkov
1962: Stoyan Slavkov
1963: Stoyan Slavkov
1964: Stoyan Slavkov
1965: Spas Dzhurov
1966: Spas Dzhurov
1967: Spas Dzhurov
1968: Not held
1969: Yordan Mlyakov
1970: Spas Dzhurov
1971: Spas Dzhurov
1972: Yordan Mlyakov
1973: Spas Dzhurov
1974: Yordan Mlyakov
1975: Rumen Petrov
1976: Rumen Petrov
1977: Atanas Andonov
1978: Atanas Andonov
1979: Atanas Andonov
1980: Razvigor Yankov
1981: Atanas Andonov
1982: Tsetsko Mitrakiev
1983: Tsetsko Mitrakiev
1984: Tsetsko Mitrakiev
1985: Tsetsko Mitrakiev
1986: Tsetsko Mitrakiev
1987: Tsetsko Mitrakiev
1988: Borislav Kolev
1989: Georgi Arnaoudov
1990: Asen Aleksandrov
1991: Georgi Arnaoudov
1992: Krasimir Petlichki
1993: Krasimir Petlichki
1994: Krasimir Petlichki
1995: Krasimir Petlichki
1996: Georgi Petrov
1997: Dimitar Georgiev
1998: Boris Vodenizharov
1999: Vladislav Iliev
2000: Marin Karailiev
2001: Miroslav Shishkov
2002: Angel Kararadev
2003: Kaloyan Kirov
2004: Kiril Osev
2005: Borislav Borisov
2006: Borislav Borisov

10,000 metres walk
The 1985 event was held as a road race.
1967: Stanimir Stoykov
1968: ?
1969: ?
1970: ?
1971: Stefan Tsoukev
1972: ?
1973: Stefan Tsoukev
1974: Georgi Georgiev
1975: ?
1976: Stefan Tsoukev
1977: Evgeni Semerdzhiev
1978: Lyubomir Ivanov
1979: ?
1980: Yancho Kamenov
1981: Alik Ibriamov
1982: Lyubomir Ivanov
1983: Lyubomir Ivanov
1984: Lyubomir Ivanov
1985: Lyubomir Ivanov
1986: Todor Todorov
1987: Lyubomir Ivanov
1988: Lyubomir Ivanov
1989: Lyubomir Ivanov
1990: Valentin Kolev
1991: Lyubomir Ivanov
1992: Valentin Andreev
1993: Avni Hasan Bekir
1994: Lyubomir Ivanov
1995: Lyubomir Ivanov
1996: Avni Hasan Bekir
1997: Lyubomir Ivanov
1998: Kaloyan Vasilev
1999: Kaloyan Vasilev
2000: Todor Ivanov
2001: Ivaylo Minkov
2002: Angel Kararadev

20 kilometres walk
1965: Dimitar Marinov
1966: Stanimir Stoykov
1967: Stanimir Stoykov
1968: ?
1969: ?
1970: ?
1971: Zhivko Stanev
1972: Stefan Tsoukev
1973: Klement Pachev
1974: Evgeni Semerdzhiev
1975: Klement Pachev
1976: Evgeni Semerdzhiev
1977: Evgeni Semerdzhiev
1978: Evgeni Semerdzhiev
1979: Yancho Kamenov
1980: Yancho Kamenov
1981: Alik Ibriamov
1982: Lyubomir Ivanov
1983: Alik Ibriamov
1984: Lyubomir Ivanov
1985: Lyubomir Ivanov
1986: Lyubomir Ivanov
1987: Lyubomir Ivanov
1988: Lyubomir Ivanov
1989: Lyubomir Ivanov
1990: Valentin Kolev
1991: Valentin Andreev
1992: Valentin Andreev
1993: Avni Hasan Bekir
1994: Avni Hasan Bekir
1995: Not held
1996: Avni Hasan Bekir
1997: Lyubomir Ivanov
1998: Avni Hasan Bekir
1999: Avni Hasan Bekir
2000: Tenyo Georgiev
2001: Ivaylo Minkov
2002: Avni Hasan Bekir
2003: Ivaylo Minkov
2004: Georgi Georgiev
2005: Georgi Georgiev
2006: Georgi Georgiev

30 kilometres walk
1992: Valentin Andreev

50 kilometres walk
1966: Dimitar Marinov
1967: Stanimir Stoykov
1968: ?
1969: ?
1970: ?
1971: Stanimir Stoykov
1972: Ivan Georgiev
1973: Svetoslav Garkov
1974: Yancho Kamenov
1975: Yancho Kamenov
1976: Yancho Kamenov
1977: Klement Pachev
1978: Yancho Kamenov
1979: Yancho Kamenov
1980: Yancho Kamenov
1981: Yancho Kamenov
1982: Valentin Kralev
1983: Roberto Iliev
1984: Ravil Ibriamov
1985: Roberto Iliev
1986: Boncho Lapkov
1987: Boncho Lapkov
1988: Mario Marinov
1989: Lyubomir Ivanov

Cross country (long course)
1965: Ivan Peev
1966: Georgi Tikhov
1967: Mikhail Zhelev
1968: Mikhail Zhelev
1969: Georgi Tikhov
1970: ?
1971: Georgi Tikhov
1972: Mikhail Zhelev
1973: Petko Yordanov
1974: Dinyo Dinev
1975: Petko Yordanov
1976: Petko Yordanov
1977: Veselin Andonov
1978: Veselin Andonov
1979: Yordan Chilikov
1980: Stanimir Nenov
1981: Stanimir Nenov
1982: Yordan Chilikov
1983: Petko Karpachev
1984: Angel Zanev
1985: Georgi Georgiev
1986: ?
1987: ?
1988: Evgeni Ignatov
1989: ?
1990: ?
1991: Borislav Danchev
1992: Borislav Danchev
1993: ?
1994: ?
1995: Ivan Chotov
1996: Dimitar Dimitrov
1997: Ivan Chotov
1998: Ivan Chotov
1999: Stanislav Lambev
2000: Dimitar Dimitrov
2001: ?
2002: Aleksandar Andonov
2003: Stanislav Lambev
2004: Stanislav Lambev
2005: Stanislav Lambev

Cross country (short course)
1965: Georgi Tikhov
1966: Mikhail Markov
1967: Mikhail Markov
1968: ?
1969: ?
1970: ?
1971: ?
1972: ?
1973: ?
1974: Vladimir Kanev
1975: Veselin Tsanov
1976: ?
1977: Angel Zanev
1978: Oleg Zdravkov
1979: Sasho Angelov
1980: ?
1981: Vasil Stoimenov
1982: ?
1983: ?
1984: Khristo Georgiev
1985: Borislav Danchev
1986: ?
1987: ?
1988: ?
1989: ?
1990: ?
1991: Ivan Ivanov
1992: ?
1993: ?
1994: ?
1995: ?
1996: ?
1997: ?
1998: ?
1999: ?
2000: ?
2001: ?
2002: ?
2003: ?
2004: Ivaylo Ignatov
2005: Ivaylo Ignatov

Women

100 metres
1960: Yanka Tomova
1961: Tsvetana Isaeva
1962: Veselina Kolarova
1963: Veselina Kolarova
1964: Snezhana Kerkova
1965: Snezhana Kerkova
1966: Antoaneta Dzhoubrilova
1967: Snezhana Dzhalova
1968: Monka Bobcheva
1969: Ivanka Valkova
1970: Ivanka Valkova
1971: Yordanka Yankova
1972: Ivanka Valkova
1973: Yordanka Yankova
1974: Yordanka Yankova
1975: Lilyana Panayotova
1976: Lilyana Panayotova
1977: Maria Stoyanova
1978: Lilyana Ivanova
1979: Lilyana Ivanova
1980: Maria Shishkova
1981: Galina Penkova
1982: Nadezhda Georgieva
1983: Nadezhda Georgieva
1984: Nadezhda Georgieva
1985: Pepa Pavlova
1986: Anelia Nuneva
1987: Anelia Nuneva
1988: Anelia Nuneva
1989: Nadezhda Georgieva
1990: Tsvetanka Ilieva
1991: Nadezhda Georgieva
1992: Anelia Nuneva
1993: Petya Pendareva
1994: Desislava Dimitrova
1995: Zlatka Georgieva
1996: Nora Ivanova
1997: Petya Pendareva
1998: Desislava Dimitrova
1999: Magdalena Khristova
2000: Monika Gachevska
2001: Monika Gachevska
2002: Ekaterina Mashova
2003: Monika Gachevska
2004: Ivet Lalova
2005: Ivet Lalova
2006: Tezdzhan Naimova

200 metres
1960: Yanka Tomova
1961: Stefka Novakova
1962: Stefka Novakova
1963: Veselina Kolarova
1964: Snezhana Kerkova
1965: Veselina Kolarova
1966: Donka Markova
1967: Snezhana Dzhalova
1968: Snezhana Dzhalova
1969: Ivanka Koshnicharska
1970: Monka Bobcheva
1971: Ivanka Venkova
1972: Ivanka Valkova
1973: Ivanka Valkova
1974: Lilyana Panayotova
1975: Lilyana Panayotova
1976: Yordanka Ivanova
1977: Ivanka Valkova
1978: Lilyana Ivanova
1979: Lilyana Ivanova
1980: Galina Penkova
1981: Galina Penkova
1982: Nadezhda Georgieva
1983: Nadezhda Georgieva
1984: Nadezhda Georgieva
1985: Pepa Pavlova
1986: Anelia Nuneva
1987: Anelia Nuneva
1988: Nadezhda Georgieva
1989: Milena Saracheva
1990: Tsvetanka Ilieva
1991: Tsvetanka Ilieva
1992: Anelia Nuneva
1993: Petya Pendareva
1994: Zlatka Georgieva
1995: Zlatka Georgieva
1996: Monika Gachevska
1997: Monika Gachevska
1998: Monika Gachevska
1999: Antonia Yakimova
2000: Monika Gachevska
2001: Monika Gachevska
2002: Ekaterina Mashova
2003: Monika Gachevska
2004: Ivet Lalova
2005: Tezdzhan Naimova
2006: Monika Ivanova

400 metres
1960: Tsvetana Isaeva
1961: Tsvetana Isaeva
1962: Tsvetana Isaeva
1963: Violeta Beneva
1964: Stefka Novakova
1965: Stefka Novakova
1966: Vasilena Amzina
1967: Lilyana Tomova
1968: Lilyana Tomova
1969: Lilyana Tomova
1970: Stefka Yordanova
1971: Svetla Zlateva
1972: Lilyana Tomova
1973: Lilyana Tomova
1974: Nikolina Shtereva
1975: Zdravka Trifonova
1976: Svetla Zlateva
1977: Violeta Tsvetkova
1978: Totka Petrova
1979: Svobodka Damyanova
1980: Malena Andonova
1981: Ivanka Venkova
1982: Kalinka Dragova
1983: Katya Ilieva
1984: Rositsa Stamenova
1985: Rositsa Stamenova
1986: Pepa Pavlova
1987: Yuliana Marinova
1988: Rositsa Stamenova
1989: Milena Saracheva
1990: Yuliana Teneva
1991: Yuliana Teneva
1992: Yuliana Teneva
1993: Yuliana Marinova
1994: Daniela Spasova
1995: Petya Strashilova
1996: Eliza Todorova
1997: Petya Strashilova
1998: Petya Strashilova
1999: Antonia Yakimova
2000: Daniela Georgieva
2001: Nedyalka Nedkova
2002: Nedyalka Nedkova
2003: Nedyalka Nedkova
2004: Mariyana Dimitrova
2005: Mariyana Dimitrova
2006: Teodora Kolarova

800 metres
1960: Tsvetana Isaeva
1961: Kipra Danailova
1962: Kipra Danailova
1963: Vasilena Amzina
1964: Stanka Mladenova
1965: Kipra Danailova
1966: Vasilena Amzina
1967: Vasilena Amzina
1968: Vasilena Amzina
1969: Tonka Petrova
1970: Tonka Petrova
1971: Tonka Petrova
1972: Lilyana Tomova
1973: Svetla Zlateva
1974: Nikolina Shtereva
1975: Rumyana Chavdarova
1976: Nikolina Shtereva
1977: Totka Petrova
1978: Totka Petrova
1979: Nikolina Shtereva
1980: Vesela Yatsinska
1981: Nikolina Shtereva
1982: Nikolina Shtereva
1983: Totka Petrova
1984: Svobodka Damyanova
1985: Nikolina Shtereva
1986: Nikolina Shtereva
1987: Anushka Dimitrova
1988: Nikolina Shtereva
1989: Nikolina Shtereva
1990: Petya Strashilova
1991: Petya Strashilova
1992: Petya Strashilova
1993: Petya Strashilova
1994: Petya Strashilova
1995: Petya Strashilova
1996: Olga Zheleva
1997: Petya Strashilova
1998: Petya Strashilova
1999: Desislava Stoyanova
2000: Yoanna Parusheva
2001: Tsvetelina Kirilova
2002: Evelina Danailova
2003: Ralitsa Atanasova
2004: Teodora Kolarova
2005: Teodora Kolarova
2006: Teodora Kolarova

1500 metres
1968: Vasilena Amzina
1969: Vasilena Amzina
1970: Vasilena Amzina
1971: Vasilena Amzina
1972: Dzhena Stefanova
1973: Svetla Zlateva
1974: Rumyana Chavdarova
1975: Rumyana Chavdarova
1976: Vesela Yatsinska
1977: Totka Petrova
1978: Rumyana Chavdarova
1979: Totka Petrova
1980: Nikolina Shtereva
1981: Vania Gospodinova
1982: Vesela Yatsinska
1983: Totka Petrova
1984: Vania Stoyanova
1985: Nikolina Shtereva
1986: Nikolina Shtereva
1987: Anushka Dimitrova
1988: Radka Naplatanova
1989: Radka Naplatanova
1990: Galina Goranova
1991: Petya Strashilova
1992: Petya Strashilova
1993: Petya Strashilova
1994: Petya Strashilova
1995: Olga Zheleva
1996: Olga Zheleva
1997: Olga Zheleva
1998: Evelina Danailova
1999: Daniela Yordanova
2000: Yoanna Parusheva
2001: Yoanna Parusheva
2002: Evelina Danailova
2003: Dobrinka Shalamanova
2004: Dobrinka Shalamanova
2005: Vania Koleva Stoyanova
2006: Natalia Drumeva

3000 metres
1976: Rumyana Chavdarova
1977: Rumyana Chavdarova
1978: Rumyana Chavdarova
1979: Vesela Yatsinska
1980: Rumyana Chavdarova
1981: Vesela Yatsinska
1982: Rumyana Chavdarova
1983: Radka Naplatanova
1984: Radka Naplatanova
1985: Nedka Keremedchieva
1986: Katya Krasteva
1987: Radka Naplatanova
1988: Radka Naplatanova
1989: Radka Naplatanova
1990: Galina Goranova
1991: Radka Naplatanova
1992: Galina Goranova
1993: Galina Goranova
1994: Milka Mikhailova

5000 metres
1995: Milka Mikhailova
1996: Galina Goranova
1997: Radka Naplatanova
1998: Daniela Yordanova
1999: Yordanka Yankova
2000: Milka Mikhailova
2001: Milka Mikhailova
2002: Rumyana Panovska
2003: Milka Mikhailova
2004: Milka Mikhailova
2005: Vania Koleva Stoyanova
2006: Milka Mikhailova

10,000 metres
1983: Rumyana Chavdarova
1984: Nedyalka Bakalova
1985: Nedka Keremedchieva
1986: Nikolina Shtereva
1987: Radka Naplatanova
1988: Radka Naplatanova
1989: Radka Naplatanova
1990: Galina Goranova
1991: Gergana Voynova
1992: Gergana Voynova
1993: Rumyana Panovska
1994: Milka Mikhailova
1995: Galina Goranova
1996: Galina Goranova
1997: Radka Naplatanova
1998: Milka Mikhailova
1999: Milka Mikhailova
2000: Milka Mikhailova
2001: Rumyana Panovska
2002: Rumyana Panovska
2003: Milka Mikhailova
2004: Milka Mikhailova
2005: Milka Mikhailova
2006: Daniela Yordanova

Half marathon
1995: Galina Goranova
1996: Galina Goranova
1997: Galina Goranova
1998: Daniela Yordanova
1999: Milka Mikhailova
2000: Milka Mikhailova
2001: Rumyana Panovska
2002: Milka Mikhailova
2003: Milka Mikhailova
2004: Rumyana Panovska
2005: Vania Koleva
2006: Dobrinka Shalamanova

Marathon
1981: Nedyalka Bakalova
1982: Nedyalka Bakalova
1983: Nedyalka Bakalova
1984: Nedyalka Bakalova
1985: Nevena Khristova
1986: Rositsa Tsoneva
1987: Rumyana Ruseva
1988: Rumyana Ruseva
1989: Rumyana Ruseva
1990: Stoyka Gandurova
1991: Gergana Voynova
1992: Gergana Voynova
1993: Gergana Voynova
1994: Gergana Voynova
1995: Gergana Voynova
1996: Rumyana Panovska
1997: Gergana Voynova
1998: Ivelina Kalcheva
1999: Rumyana Panovska
2000: Rumyana Panovska
2001: Milka Mikhailova
2002: Milka Mikhailova
2003: Rumyana Panovska
2004: Rumyana Panovska
2005: Milka Mikhailova

3000 metres steeplechase
2002: Rumyana Panovska
2003: Rumyana Panovska
2004: Ralitsa Atanasova
2005: Dobrinka Shalamanova
2006: Yonka Aleksandrova

80 metres hurdles
1960: Snezhana Kerkova
1961: Snezhana Kerkova
1962: Verka Angelova
1963: Snezhana Kerkova
1964: Snezhana Kerkova
1965: Snezhana Kerkova
1966: Snezhana Dzhalova
1967: Snezhana Dzhalova
1968: Snezhana Dzhalova

100 metres hurdles
1968: Tsvetana Andreeva
1969: Dimitrina Koleva
1970: Nedyalka Angelova
1971: Ivanka Koshnicharska
1972: Ivanka Koshnicharska
1973: Ivanka Koshnicharska
1974: Penka Sokolova
1975: Penka Sokolova
1976: Penka Sokolova
1977: Lidia Gusheva
1978: Lidia Gusheva
1979: Daniela Teneva
1980: Yordanka Donkova
1981: Daniela Valkova
1982: Yordanka Donkova
1983: Ginka Zagorcheva
1984: Yordanka Donkova
1985: Ginka Zagorcheva
1986: Yordanka Donkova
1987: Ginka Zagorcheva
1988: Svetla Dimitrova
1989: Ginka Zagorcheva
1990: Ginka Zagorcheva
1991: Diana Ruskova
1992: Svetla Dimitrova
1993: Svetla Dimitrova
1994: Yordanka Donkova
1995: Svetla Dimitrova
1996: Yurka Khristova
1997: Silvia Penkova
1998: Svetla Dimitrova
1999: Svetla Damova
2000: Gergana Stoyanova
2001: Yana Kasova
2002: Desislava Mutafchieva
2003: Desislava Mutafchieva
2004: Desislava Mutafchieva
2005: Desislava Mutafchieva
2006: Desislava Mutafchieva

200 metres hurdles
1969: Ivanka Koshnicharska
1970: Ivanka Koshnicharska
1971: Ivanka Koshnicharska
1972: Ivanka Koshnicharska
1973: Krasimira Filipova
1974: Ivanka Yovcheva
1975: Krasimira Filipova

400 metres hurdles
1976: Velichka Marinova
1977: Zlatina Ilieva
1978: Yordanka Ivanova
1979: Bonka Dimova
1980: Bonka Dimova
1981: Nadezhda Asenova
1982: Nadezhda Asenova
1983: Nadezhda Asenova
1984: Nadezhda Asenova
1985: Nadezhda Asenova
1986: Bonka Peneva
1987: Bonka Peneva
1988: Bonka Peneva
1989: Teodora Khristova
1990: Emilia Bachvarova
1991: Yordanka Stoyanova
1992: Yordanka Stoyanova
1993: Valya Demireva
1994: Daniela Spasova
1995: Eliza Tsvetanova
1996: Rositsa Milenova
1997: Elena Koleva
1998: Tsvetelina Kirilova
1999: Desislava Stoyanova
2000: Desislava Stoyanova
2001: Vania Stambolova
2002: Vania Stambolova
2003: Mariyana Dimitrova
2004: Mariyana Dimitrova
2005: Vania Stambolova
2006: Vania Stambolova

High jump
1960: Tsvetana Vasileva
1961: Genoveva Cherkezova
1962: Anka Rouseva
1963: Anka Rouseva
1964: Vesa Koleva
1965: Yordanka Blagoeva
1966: Snezhana Yurukova
1967: Katya Lazova
1968: Yordanka Blagoeva
1969: Yordanka Blagoeva
1970: Katya Lazova
1971: Katya Lazova
1972: Yordanka Blagoeva
1973: Yordanka Blagoeva
1974: Stanka Valkanova
1975: Yordanka Blagoeva
1976: Stanka Valkanova
1977: Yordanka Blagoeva
1978: Tatyana Kamareva
1979: Yordanka Blagoeva
1980: Yordanka Blagoeva
1981: Lyudmila Andonova
1982: Lyudmila Andonova
1983: Silvia Koeva
1984: Lyudmila Andonova
1985: Stefka Kostadinova
1986: Stefka Kostadinova
1987: Stefka Kostadinova
1988: Stefka Kostadinova
1989: Rosanel Gogi
1990: Svetlana Leseva
1991: Stefka Kostadinova
1992: Lyudmila Andonova
1993: Eleonora Milusheva
1994: Eleonora Milusheva
1995: Venelina Veneva
1996: Stefka Kostadinova
1997: Khristina Kalcheva
1998: Khristina Kalcheva
1999: Eleonora Milusheva
2000: Eleonora Milusheva
2001: Eleonora Milusheva
2002: Eleonora Milusheva
2003: Maria Nikolova
2004: Venelina Veneva
2005: Elena Denkova
2006: Maria Nikolova

Pole vault
1995: Tania Koleva
1996: Not held
1997: Tania Koleva
1998: Iva Vasileva
1999: Vera Chavdarova
2000: Tania Koleva
2001: Vera Chavdarova
2002: Vera Chavdarova
2003: Vera Chavdarova
2004: Vera Chavdarova
2005: Tania Stefanova
2006: Vera Chavdarova

Long jump
1960: Diana Yorgova
1961: Diana Yorgova
1962: Diana Yorgova
1963: Diana Yorgova
1964: Diana Yorgova
1965: Diana Yorgova
1966: Diana Yorgova
1967: Ivanka Tikhova
1968: Ivanka Koshnicharska
1969: Diana Yorgova
1970: Nedyalka Angelova
1971: Diana Yorgova
1972: Diana Yorgova
1973: Lilyana Panayotova
1974: Penka Sokolova
1975: Penka Sokolova
1976: Lilyana Panayotova
1977: Ekaterina Nedeva
1978: Lidia Gusheva
1979: Daniela Valkova
1980: Ekaterina Nedeva
1981: Ivanka Venkova
1982: Lidia Gusheva
1983: Vangelia Ilieva
1984: Lyudmila Ninova
1985: Silvia Khristova
1986: Lyudmila Ninova
1987: Lyudmila Ninova
1988: Tsetska Kancheva
1989: Ivanka Valkova
1990: Sofia Bozhanova
1991: Sofia Bozhanova
1992: Iva Prandzheva
1993: Yurka Khristova
1994: Shasmina Nikolova
1995: Iliyana Ilieva
1996: Magdalena Khristova
1997: Antonia Stoyanova
1998: Magdalena Khristova
1999: Magdalena Khristova
2000: Mariya Dimitrova
2001: Antonia Yordanova
2002: Antonia Yordanova
2003: Antonia Yordanova
2004: Antonia Yordanova
2005: Darinka Yotova
2006: Antonia Yordanova

Triple jump
1990: Sofia Bozhanova
1991: Sofia Bozhanova
1992: Dimitrinka Stoyanova
1993: Iva Prandzheva
1994: Mariya Dimitrova
1995: Venelina Veneva
1996: Tereza Marinova
1997: Zlatka Radukanova
1998: Tereza Marinova
1999: Mariya Dimitrova
2000: Iva Prandzheva
2001: Mariya Dimitrova
2002: Eliza Todorova
2003: Nina Serbezova
2004: Mariya Dimitrova
2005: Mariya Dimitrova
2006: Tereza Marinova

Shot put
1960: Tsvetana Asenova
1961: Ivanka Khristova
1962: Ivanka Khristova
1963: Ivanka Khristova
1964: Ivanka Khristova
1965: Ivanka Khristova
1966: Ivanka Khristova
1967: Lidia Sharamovich
1968: Ivanka Khristova
1969: Ivanka Khristova
1970: Ivanka Khristova
1971: Ivanka Khristova
1972: Ivanka Khristova
1973: Ivanka Khristova
1974: Ivanka Khristova
1975: Ruska Dzhendova
1976: Elena Stoyanova
1977: Elena Stoyanova
1978: Ivanka Stoycheva
1979: Ivanka Stoycheva
1980: Verzhinia Veselinova
1981: Verzhinia Veselinova
1982: Verzhinia Veselinova
1983: Snezhana Vasileva
1984: Svetla Mitkova
1985: Svetla Mitkova
1986: Svetla Mitkova
1987: Svetla Mitkova
1988: Verzhinia Veselinova
1989: Verzhinia Veselinova
1990: Svetla Mitkova
1991: Svetla Mitkova
1992: Svetla Mitkova
1993: Svetla Mitkova
1994: Svetla Mitkova
1995: Svetla Mitkova
1996: Svetla Mitkova
1997: Svetla Mitkova
1998: Svetla Mitkova
1999: Anelia Yordanova
2000: Anelia Yordanova
2001: Anelia Yordanova
2002: Anelia Kumanova
2003: Anelia Kumanova
2004: Anelia Kumanova
2005: Radoslava Mavrodieva
2006: Galina Ivanova

Discus throw
1960: Verzhinia Mikhailova
1961: Verzhinia Mikhailova
1962: Verzhinia Mikhailova
1963: Verzhinia Mikhailova
1964: Verzhinia Mikhailova
1965: Verzhinia Mikhailova
1966: Ivanka Khristova
1967: Vasilka Stoeva
1968: Vasilka Stoeva
1969: Vasilka Stoeva
1970: Vasilka Stoeva
1971: Vasilka Stoeva
1972: Radostina Vasekova
1973: Vasilka Stoeva
1974: Maria Vergova
1975: Radostina Bakhchevanova
1976: Maria Vergova
1977: Maria Vergova
1978: Svetla Bozhkova
1979: Svetla Bozhkova
1980: Svetla Bozhkova
1981: Maria Petkova
1982: Maria Petkova
1983: Svetla Mitkova
1984: Maria Petkova
1985: Tsvetanka Khristova
1986: Tsvetanka Khristova
1987: Tsvetanka Khristova
1988: Tsvetanka Khristova
1989: Tsvetanka Khristova
1990: Svetla Mitkova
1991: Tsvetanka Khristova
1992: Stefania Simova
1993: Svetla Mitkova
1994: Atanaska Angelova
1995: Atanaska Angelova
1996: Atanaska Angelova
1997: Tsvetanka Khristova
1998: Svetla Mitkova
1999: Venera Getova
2000: Venera Getova
2001: Tsvetanka Khristova
2002: Venera Getova
2003: Venera Getova
2004: Tsvetanka Khristova
2005: Tsvetanka Khristova
2006: Tsvetanka Khristova

Hammer throw
The 1995 event was completed with a non-standard 5 kg implement.
1995: Anelia Yordanova
1996: Anelia Yordanova
1997: Anelia Yordanova
1998: Veselina Ivancheva
1999: Anelia Yordanova
2000: Anelia Yordanova
2001: Anelia Yordanova
2002: Anelia Kumanova
2003: Anelia Kumanova
2004: Anelia Kumanova
2005: Siyana Kirilova
2006: Siyana Kirilova

Javelin throw
1960: Yoanna Arsova
1961: Yoanna Arsova
1962: Margarita Baltakova
1963: Margarita Baltakova
1964: Yoanna Arsova
1965: Yoanna Arsova
1966: Zhuzhana Zhelyazkova
1967: Zhuzhana Zhelyazkova
1968: Zhuzhana Zhelyazkova
1969: Lyutvian Mollova
1970: Emilia Mirazchiyska
1971: Zhuzhana Zhelyazkova
1972: Lyutvian Mollova
1973: Lyutvian Mollova
1974: Lyutvian Mollova
1975: Yordanka Peeva
1976: Yordanka Peeva
1977: Ivanka Vancheva
1978: Tsvetana Ralinska
1979: Tsvetana Ralinska
1980: Ivanka Vancheva
1981: Antoaneta Todorova
1982: Antoaneta Todorova
1983: Antoaneta Todorova
1984: Antoaneta Todorova
1985: Maria Dzhaleva
1986: Ivanka Vancheva
1987: Antoaneta Selenska
1988: Antoaneta Selenska
1989: Sonia Radicheva
1990: Antoaneta Selenska
1991: Antoaneta Selenska
1992: Antoaneta Selenska
1993: Antoaneta Selenska
1994: Antoaneta Selenska
1995: Sonia Radicheva
1996: Sonia Radicheva
1997: Khristina Georgieva
1998: Khristina Georgieva
1999: Khristina Georgieva
2000: Rumyana Karapetrova
2001: Khristina Georgieva
2002: Daniela Todorova
2003: Rumyana Karapetrova
2004: Khristina Georgieva
2005: Rumyana Karapetrova
2006: Rumyana Karapetrova

Pentathlon
1960: Snezhana Kerkova
1961: Tsvetana Vasileva
1962: Sasha Varbanova
1963: Donka Naneva
1964: Sasha Varbanova
1965: Sasha Varbanova
1966: Sasha Varbanova
1967: Sasha Varbanova
1968: Snezhana Yurukova
1969: Nedyalka Angelova
1970: Nedyalka Angelova
1971: Nedyalka Angelova
1972: Sasha Varbanova
1973: Snezhana Yurukova
1974: Snezhana Yurukova
1975: Sasha Varbanova
1976: Valentina Dimitrova
1977: Valentina Dimitrova
1978: Mariana Babova
1979: Valentina Dimitrova
1980: Emilia Pencheva

Heptathlon
1981: Galina Bakhchevanova
1982: Valentina Dimitrova
1983: Valentina Dimitrova
1984: Emilia Pencheva
1985: Valya Vasileva
1986: Tania Tarkalanova
1987: Ivanka Valkova
1988: Emilia Dimitrova
1989: Svetla Dimitrova
1990: Yurka Khristova
1991: Yurka Khristova
1992: Yurka Khristova
1993: Yurka Khristova
1994: Yurka Khristova
1995: Antonia Yordanova
1996: Mladenka Apostolova
1997: Evelina Milenova
1998: Iveta Ivanova
1999: Ilona Mancheva
2000: Not held
2001: Maria Nikolova
2002: Maria Nikolova
2003: Maria Nikolova
2004: Maria Nikolova
2005: Kristina Damyanova
2006: Kristina Damyanova

5000 metres walk
The 1985 championship was held as a road event.
1983: Pepa Bogdanova
1984: Pepa Bogdanova
1985: Atanaska Dzhivkova
1986: Atanaska Dzhivkova
1987: Atanaska Dzhivkova
1988: Not held
1989: Valeria Todorova
1990: Not held
1991: Not held
1992: Nevena Mineva
1993: Nevena Mineva
1994: Nevena Mineva
1995: Nevena Mineva
1996: Ginka Radeva
1997: Nevena Mineva
1998: Nevena Mineva
1999: Nevena Mineva-Dimitrova
2000: Nevena Mineva-Dimitrova
2001: Nevena Mineva-Dimitrova

10,000 metres walk
1986: Atanaska Dzhivkova
1987: Atanaska Dzhivkova
1988: Atanaska Dzhivkova
1989: Atanaska Dzhivkova
1990: Atanaska Dzhivkova

10 kilometres walk
1991: Atanaska Dzhivkova
1992: Nevena Mineva
1993: Ginka Radeva
1994: Nevena Mineva

20 kilometres walk
1988: Atanaska Dzhivkova
1989: Not held
1990: Atanaska Dzhivkova
1991: Not held
1992: Not held
1993: Not held
1994: Not held
1995: Not held
1996: Not held
1997: Not held
1998: Not held
1999: Nevena Mineva-Dimitrova
2000: Nevena Mineva-Dimitrova
2001: Nevena Mineva-Dimitrova
2002: Nevena Mineva-Dimitrova
2003: Nevena Mineva-Dimitrova
2004: Nevena Mineva-Dimitrova
2005: Iliyana Nyagolova
2006: Radostina Dimitrova

Cross country (long course)
1965: Kipra Danailova
1966: Kipra Danailova
1967: Kipra Danailova
1968: Kipra Danailova
1969: Kipra Danailova
1970: ?
1971: Anka Doncheva
1972: Tonka Petrova
1973: Rumyana Chavdarova
1974: Rositsa Pekhlivanova
1975: Mariana Grigorova
1976: Vasilena Amzina
1977: Rositsa Pekhlivanova
1978: Rumyana Chavdarova
1979: Rositsa Pekhlivanova
1980: Rumyana Chavdarova
1981: Rositsa Pekhlivanova
1982: Vania Gospodinova
1983: Nedka Keremedchieva
1984: Radka Naplatanova
1985: Vania Gospodinova
1986: ?
1987: ?
1988: Radka Naplatanova
1989: ?
1990: ?
1991: Galina Goranova
1992: Milka Mikhailova
1993: ?
1994: ?
1995: Milka Mikhailova
1996: Galina Goranova
1997: Olga Zheleva
1998: Milka Mikhailova
1999: Milka Mikhailova
2000: Rumyana Panovska
2001: ?
2002: Milka Mikhailova
2003: Milka Mikhailova
2004: Milka Mikhailova
2005: Rumyana Panovska

Cross country (short course)
2004: Rumyana Panovska
2005: Rumyana Panovska

References

Champions 1960–2006
Bulgarian Championships. GBR Athletics. Retrieved 2021-02-08.

Winners
 List
Bulgarian Championships
Athletics